Giacomo Franceschini (1672–1745) (also called Jacopo Franceschini) was an Italian painter.

He was the son and scholar of Marc Antonio Franceschini, was born at Bologna in 1672. He painted historical pictures in the style of his father, and there are some of his works in the churches at Bologna. In Santa Maria Incoronata is a picture of St. Usualdo, St. Margaret, St. Lucy, and St. Cecilia ; in San Simone, The Crucifixion; and in San Martino, St. Anne. Franceschini died at Bologna in 1745. Giuseppe Pedretti was one of his students.

Notes

Sources
 Artist data
 Arte Antica 

Attribution:

External links

1672 births
1745 deaths
17th-century Italian painters
Italian male painters
18th-century Italian painters
Painters from Bologna
18th-century Italian male artists